The discography of Rodney Crowell, an American country music artist, consists of 17 studio albums and 39 singles. Although he first charted on Hot Country Songs in 1978, he did not reach top 40 on that chart until 1981, with "Stars on the Water". His 1988 album Diamonds & Dirt produced five consecutive number-one singles, the only ones of his career.

Studio albums

1970s–1980s

1990s–2000s

2010s–2020s

Compilation albums

Singles

1970s—1980s

1990s

2000s—2020s

As featured artist

Music videos

See also
The Notorious Cherry Bombs

Notes

References

Crowell, Rodney
 
 
Crowell, Rodney